The Illyrians,) were a conglomeration of Indo-European peoples and tribes in the Balkan Peninsula, Southeastern Europe. They spoke the Illyrian language and practiced a multitude of common religious and cultural practices. Many of Illyrian groups formed a distinct tribal mode of social organisation, which survived much later in the form of the Albanian tribal system.

In late Iron Age and early classical antiquity, the first polities of the area would be created by tribal groupings, including the Taulantii and Dardani. The most powerful Illyrian states of the area, the Ardiaean kingdom, emerged in the 3rd century BC during the rule of Agron and Teuta. The Illyrians came into conflict with Roman Republic and were defeated in the Illyrian Wars, which were followed by many revolts. The largest and last of them was the Great Illyrian Revolt (6-9 BC). The beginning of the integration of the region of Illyria in the Roman world followed the revolt and saw many Illyrians rise through the ranks of the Roman society and the Roman army in particular which produced several emperors of Illyrian origin.

A

B

C

D

E

I

J

K

M

S

T

V

Historical rulers

Enchelean - Taulantian rulers 

 Galaurus: king of Taulantii. Unsuccessfully invaded Macedonia between 678 and 640 BC.
 Grabos I (5th century BC): attested on an Athenian inscription, he was very likely a person with great political responsibilities. He probably was the grandfather of Grabos II.
 Sirras (437–390 BC), ruler in Lyncestis.
 Grabos II (r. 358–356 BC): entered Athenian alliance to resist Philip's power in 356 BC.
 Pleuratus I (r. 356–335 BC): reigned near the Adriatic coast in southern Illyria. In a losing effort in 344 BC, tried to thwart Philip's advances in Illyria.
 Pleurias (r. c. 337/336 BC): Illyrian ruler who campaigned against Philip II about 337 BC. He is considered by some scholars as king of either the Autariatae, the Taulantii, or the Dardani. Some have suggested that he was the same as Pleuratus I; Pleurias is mentioned only in Diodorus (16.93.6), elsewhere unattested  in ancient sources.
 Cleitus, son of Bardylis I (r. 335–295 BC): mastermind behind the Illyrian Revolt in Pelion of 335 BC against Alexander the Great.
 Glaucias: king of Taulantii. He aided Cleitus at the Battle of Pelion in 335 BC, raised Pyrrhus of Epirus and was involved in other events in southern Illyria in the late 4th century BC.
 Monunius I, (r. 290–270 BC): reigned during the Gallic invasions of 279 BC. He minted his own silver staters in Dyrrhachion.
 Mytilos, successor of Monunius I and probably his son (r. 270–?): waged war on Epirus in 270 BC. He minted his own bronze coins in Dyrrhachion.

Ardiaean-Labeatan rulers

 Pleuratus II: reigned in a time of peace and prosperity for the Illyrian kingdom., ruled BC 260 ~ BC 250
 Teuta (regent for Pinnes): forced to come to terms with the Romans in 227 BC.
 Demetrius of Pharos: surrenders to the Romans at Pharos in 218 BC and flees to Macedonia., ruled B.C 222~B.C 219
 Scerdilaidas: allied with Rome to defeat Macedonia in 208 BC., ruled B.C 218~B.C 206
 Pinnes: too young to become king; ruled under the regency of Teuta, Demetrius and Scerdilaidas., ruled B.C 230~B.C 217
 Pleuratus III: rewarded by the Romans in 196 BC, with lands annexed by the Macedonians., ruled B.C 205~B.C 181
  Gentius: defeated by the Romans in 168 BC during the Third Illyrian War; Illyrian kingdom ceased to exist while the king was taken prisoner., ruled B.C 181~B.C 168

Dardanian rulers

 Longarus: invaded northern borders of the Illyrian kingdom in 229 BC while Teuta was dealing with campaigns in Epirus.
 Monunius of Dardania: repelled the Bastarnae Invasion of Dardania in 175 BC.

Other rulers

Histria
 Epulon, ruler of Histria: thwarted Roman advances in the Istrian peninsula until his death in 177 BC.

Dalmatae
 Verzo, ruler of the Dalmatae: took the city of Promona from the Liburni in order to ambush Octavian in 34 BC.
 Testimos, ruler of the Dalmatae: defeated by the Romans in 33 BC; Dalmatia incorporated into Roman Republic.

Messapia
 Opis of Messapia: attacked by Taras in 460 BC at Hyria, in which he died.

Pannonia
 Pinnes of Pannonia: led Pannonians in the Great Illyrian Revolt from 6 AD.

Minor rulers
 Ionios: ruled over Issa and the surrounding region in the first half of the 4th century BC, probably after the fall of Dionysius of Syracuse in 367 BC.
 Caeria: Illyrian queen who ruled to 344/343BC.

See also 
List of ancient Illyrian peoples and tribes
List of settlements in Illyria

References

Bibliography 

Illyrians
Illyrians